Kaustubh may refer to
 Kaustubha (Sanskrit: कौस्तुभ), a divine jewel or "Mani", in the possession of Lord Vishnu
Kaustubh Khade (born 1987), Indian kayaker
Kaustubh Pawar (born 1990), Indian cricketer

Indian masculine given names